Mystus cavasius, the Gangetic mystus, is a species of catfish of the family Bagridae.

In the wild it is found in Indian Subcontinent countries such as, India, Bangladesh, Pakistan, Sri Lanka, Nepal, and Myanmar. Reports of this species from the Mekong basins, Malaysia, and Indonesia are misidentifications of the species Mystus albolineatus or Mystus singaringan. Few populations are occur in Thailand, but only in the Salween basin.

It grows to a length of 40 cm. The pectoral spine of the species may give painful wounds and sometimes can be venomous.

The population is known to be decreasing in recent past, due to catching, pet trading and habitat destruction.

References 

Bagridae
Catfish of Asia
Fish of South Asia
Fish of Southeast Asia
Freshwater fish of India
Freshwater fish of Sri Lanka
Fish of Bangladesh
Fish described in 1822